Toal may refer to:

People
Gerard Toal (born 1962), Professor of Government, Virginia Polytechnic Institute and State University
Graham Toal, co-instigator of CDDB (Compact Disc Database)
Jean H. Toal (born 1943), South Carolina Chief Justice
Joseph Toal, Scottish Roman Catholic clergyman, currently Bishop of Argyll and the Isles
Maureen Toal, played Teasy McDaid in Glenroe

Other
TOAL, Test of Adolescent and Adult Language

See also
O'Toole (disambiguation), a more common anglicization of ó Tuathail than Toal is